Rentrer en Soi is the second album by Japanese rock band Rentrer en Soi. It was released on May 31, 2006 in Japan and on August 28, 2007 in Europe.

Track listing 

2006 albums
Rentrer en Soi albums